Delosperma aberdeenense, called the Aberdeen dew plant, is a species of flowering plant in the ice plant family Aizoaceae, native to the Cape Provinces of South Africa. It has gained the Royal Horticultural Society's Award of Garden Merit.

References

aberdeenense
Endemic flora of South Africa
Plants described in 1928
Taxa named by Louisa Bolus